Clypeoplex is a genus of parasitoid wasps belonging to the family Ichneumonidae.

The genus was first described by Horstmann in 1987.

Species:
 Clypeoplex cerophagus (Gravenhorst, 1829)

References

Campopleginae
Ichneumonidae genera